Chelsea Lankes is an American electro-pop musician from Fort Worth, Texas.

Career
Lankes began her career in 2010, chronicling the creation of her first EP on her blog. To Begin With, Everything was released in 2011, and the following year a second EP, Ringing Bell, followed.

Lankes released another EP in March 2015 titled Down For Whatever/Too Young to Fall In Love. Since then she has released the singles Secret and Ghost.

References

American pop musicians
American indie pop musicians
Singers from Texas
People from Fort Worth, Texas
Living people
Year of birth missing (living people)